Cantonese or Guangdong cuisine, also known as Yue cuisine ( or ) is the cuisine of Guangdong province of China, particularly the provincial capital Guangzhou, and the surrounding regions in the Pearl River Delta including Hong Kong and Macau. Strictly speaking, Cantonese cuisine is the cuisine of Guangzhou or of Cantonese speakers, but it often includes the cooking styles of all the speakers of Yue Chinese languages in Guangdong. Scholars categorize Guangdong cuisine into three major groups based on the region's dialect: Cantonese, Hakka and Chaozhou cuisines. 

The Teochew cuisine and Hakka cuisine of Guangdong are considered their own styles, as is neighboring Guangxi's cuisine despite eastern Guangxi being considered culturally Cantonese due to the presence of ethnic Zhuang influences in the rest of the province. Cantonese cuisine is one of the Eight Culinary Traditions of Chinese cuisine. Its prominence outside China is due to the large number of Cantonese emigrants. Chefs trained in Cantonese cuisine are highly sought after throughout China. Until the late 20th century, most Chinese restaurants in the West served largely Cantonese dishes.

Background

Guangzhou (Canton) City, the provincial capital of Guangdong and the centre of Cantonese culture, has long been a trading hub and many imported foods and ingredients are used in Cantonese cuisine. Besides pork, beef and chicken, Cantonese cuisine incorporates almost all edible meats, including offal, chicken feet, duck's tongue, frog legs, snakes and snails. However, lamb and goat are less commonly used than in the cuisines of northern or western China. Many cooking methods are used, with steaming and stir-frying being the most favoured due to their convenience and rapidity. Other techniques include shallow frying, double steaming, braising and deep frying.

Compared to other Chinese regional cuisines, the flavours of most traditional Cantonese dishes should be well-balanced and not greasy. Apart from that, spices should be used in modest amounts to avoid overwhelming the flavours of the primary ingredients, and these ingredients in turn should be at the peak of their freshness and quality. There is no widespread use of fresh herbs in Cantonese cooking, in contrast with their liberal use in other cuisines such as Sichuanese, Vietnamese, Lao, Thai and European. Garlic chives and coriander leaves are notable exceptions, although the former are often used as a vegetable and the latter are usually used as mere garnish in most dishes.

Foods

Sauces and condiments 
In Cantonese cuisine, ingredients such as sugar, salt, soy sauce, rice wine, corn starch, vinegar, scallion and sesame oil suffice to enhance flavour, although garlic is heavily used in some dishes, especially those in which internal organs, such as entrails, may emit unpleasant odours. Ginger, chili peppers, five-spice powder, powdered black pepper, star anise and a few other spices are also used, but often sparingly.

Dried and preserved ingredients
Although Cantonese cooks pay much attention to the freshness of their primary ingredients, Cantonese cuisine also uses a long list of preserved food items to add flavour to a dish. This may be influenced by Hakka cuisine, since the Hakkas were once a dominant group occupying imperial Hong Kong and other southern territories.

Some items gain very intense flavours during the drying/preservation/oxidation process and some foods are preserved to increase their shelf life. Some chefs combine both dried and fresh varieties of the same items in a dish. Dried items are usually soaked in water to rehydrate before cooking. These ingredients are generally not served a la carte, but rather with vegetables or other Cantonese dishes.

Traditional dishes
A number of dishes have been part of Cantonese cuisine since the earliest territorial establishments of Guangdong. While many of these are on the menus of typical Cantonese restaurants, some simpler ones are more commonly found in Cantonese homes. Home-made Cantonese dishes are usually served with plain white rice.

Deep fried dishes

There are a small number of deep-fried dishes in Cantonese cuisine, which can often be found as street food. They have been extensively documented in colonial Hong Kong records of the 19th and 20th centuries. A few are synonymous with Cantonese breakfast and lunch, even though these are also part of other cuisines.

Soups 

Old fire soup, or lou fo tong, is a clear broth prepared by simmering meat and other ingredients over a low heat for several hours. Chinese herbs are often used as ingredients. There are basically two ways to make old fire soup – put ingredients and water in the pot and heat it directly on fire, which is called bou tong; or put the ingredients in a small stew pot, and put it in a bigger pot filled with water, then heat the bigger pot on fire directly, which is called dun tong. The latter way can keep the most original taste of the soup.

Soup chain stores or delivery outlets in cities with significant Cantonese populations, such as Hong Kong, serve this dish due to the long preparation time required of slow-simmered soup.

Seafood 

Due to Guangdong's location along the South China Sea coast, fresh seafood is prominent in Cantonese cuisine, and many Cantonese restaurants keep aquariums or seafood tanks on the premises. In Cantonese cuisine, as in cuisines from other parts of Asia, if seafood has a repugnant odour, strong spices and marinating juices are added; the freshest seafood is odourless and, in Cantonese culinary arts, is best cooked by steaming. For instance, in some recipes, only a small amount of soy sauce, ginger and spring onion is added to steamed fish. In Cantonese cuisine, the light seasoning is used only to bring out the natural sweetness of the seafood. As a rule of thumb, the spiciness of a dish is usually negatively correlated to the freshness of the ingredients.

Noodle dishes 

Noodles are served either in soup broth or fried. These are available as home-cooked meals, on dim sum side menus, or as street food at dai pai dongs, where they can be served with a variety of toppings such as fish balls, beef balls, or fish slices.

Siu mei

Siu mei is essentially the Chinese rotisserie style of cooking. Unlike most other Cantonese dishes, siu mei solely consists of meat, with no vegetables.

Lou mei

Lou mei is the name given to dishes made from internal organs, entrails and other left-over parts of animals. It is widely available in southern Chinese regions.

Siu laap

All Cantonese-style cooked meats, including siu mei, lou mei and preserved meat can be classified as siu laap. Siu laap also includes dishes such as:

A typical dish may consist of offal and half an order of multiple varieties of roasted meat. The majority of siu laap is white meat.

Little pot rice

Little pot rice are dishes cooked and served in a flat-bottomed pot (as opposed to a round-bottomed wok). Usually this is a saucepan or braising pan (see clay pot cooking). Such dishes are cooked by covering and steaming, making the rice and ingredients very hot and soft. Usually the ingredients are layered on top of the rice with little or no mixing in between. Many standard combinations exist.

Banquet/dinner dishes

A number of dishes are traditionally served in Cantonese restaurants only at dinner time. Dim sum restaurants stop serving bamboo-basket dishes after the yum cha period (equivalent to afternoon tea) and begin offering an entirely different menu in the evening. Some dishes are standard while others are regional. Some are customised for special purposes such as Chinese marriages or banquets. Salt and pepper dishes are one of the few spicy dishes.

Dessert

After the evening meal, most Cantonese restaurants offer tong sui, a sweet soup. Many varieties of tong sui are also found in other Chinese cuisines. Some desserts are traditional, while others are recent innovations. The more expensive restaurants usually offer their specialty desserts. Sugar water is the general name of dessert in Guangdong province. It is cooked by adding water and sugar to some other cooking ingredients.

Delicacies

Certain Cantonese delicacies consist of parts taken from rare or endangered animals, which raises controversy over animal rights and environmental issues. This is often due to alleged health benefits of certain animal products. For example, the continued spreading of the idea that shark cartilage can cure cancer has led to decreased shark populations even though scientific research has found no evidence to support the credibility of shark cartilage as a cancer cure.

See also
 Cantonese culture
 Chinese food therapy
 Dim sum
 Hong Kong cuisine
 List of Chinese dishes
 Macanese cuisine
 Restaurant industry in Guangzhou

References

Further reading

Eight Immortal Flavors: Secrets of Cantonese Cookery from San Francisco's Chinatown, Johnny Kan and Charles L. Leong. Berkeley, California: Howell-North Books, 1963

 
Cantonese culture
Hong Kong cuisine
Macau cuisine
Regional cuisines of China